d'Ornano is a surname. Notable people with the surname include:

Anne d'Ornano (born 1936), French politician
Camille d'Ornano, French lieutenant colonel and colonial administrator
Jean-Baptiste d'Ornano (1581–1626), French aristocrat
Michel d'Ornano (1924–1991), French politician
Mireille d'Ornano (born 1951), French politician
Philippe Antoine d'Ornano (1784–1863), French soldier and politician